Havant RFC is an English rugby union club, playing in the RFU's London SE Premier , and is a member of the Hampshire RFU.

Havant currently run four senior men's teams  – 1st XV, 2nd XV (Dolphins) – who play in the Solent League, 3rd XV ('A' XV) – who play in Hampshire 2 and a veteran's side (The Mariners). In addition to the senior men's teams there is an Academy team (under 19s) – who play in Hampshire Colts League Division 1 – and two senior women’s teams, the first XV, who are playing in the RFUW's Women's National Championship South 2 League for the 2016–17 season and the Sirens.   Additionally Havant Minis and Juniors run sides covering every age from infant school to sixth form.

History
Havant RFC, 'Hav', was founded in April 1951 and came to their present home, at Hook's Lane, Bedhampton, two years later. The clubhouse, which was built by members of the club, was opened in 1955 by the Lady Mayoress of Portsmouth.   
   
Ten years after its founding, HRFC was running five sides. In 1962 the colts were started and there were further extensions to the clubhouse. A new clubhouse was opened at the end of 1975 and in 1993 there were further extensions including the addition of an all-seater grandstand.   
    
Early milestones in the club's playing history were the winning of the Hampshire Cup for the first time in 1974–75 and then, in 1975–76, becoming the first Junior Club to get through to the last 16 of the John Player Cup. HRFC have now won the Hampshire Cup 19 times, most recently in the 2017-18 season and have appeared in the final 28 times in the period from 1970 to 2018.
   
The highlights of the league campaigns were gaining promotion to National League 3 at the end of 1991–92, and then finishing joint top of that division the following season, missing promotion on points difference after surprisingly losing their last match at Aspatria which, had they succeeded, would have made the club one of the top twenty clubs in the country. After a difficult period in the second half of the 1990s (concurrent with the advent of professionalism), the club halted their slide in 2000–01 and fought their way back into the National Leagues the following season. They were immediately relegated, but bounced straight back at the end of the next season, and in 2004–05 managed a top half of the table finish to establish themselves at this level.

In 2005–06 HRFC consolidated their National League 3 South credentials with a mid-table finish and in 2006–07 they mounted their best campaign in recent years to finish just outside the promotion places in 3rd position. The following seasons have been difficult for 'Hav' with many players leaving the area, retiring or moving to other clubs – ultimately leading to relegations after the 2008–09 season and the 2011–12 season to get to their current level.

League record

Honours
1st team:
Hampshire Cup winners (19): 1975, 1978, 1979, 1980, 1984, 1985, 1986, 1987, 1988, 1989, 1991, 1996, 2005, 2006, 2007, 2008, 2015, 2017, 2018
Courage National Division 4 South champions: 1991–92
London Division 1 champions (2 times): 2001–02, 2003–04
London 1 South champions: 2019–20

3rd team:
Hampshire 2 champions: 2018–19

Notable club members
Mick Chalk, awarded the British Empire Medal in the Queen's Birthday Honours List for 2012, shortly before his death
Ngapaku Ngapaku ('Pux'), Fly-half who had earlier represented , played a number of seasons at Havant in the 2000s
Mike Wedderburn, Sky Sports presenter and former Harlequins and London Wasps Winger, played his early rugby in the late 1980s at Havant
Derek White, former  and British and Irish Lions No. 8, played a handful of games for Havant in the 1990s

The club badge

The figure in the top half of the shield is that used in heraldry to represent a Dolphin. The significance to the club of the Dolphin is that the club was founded at a meeting in The Dolphin Hotel in Havant on 27 April 1951. At that time The Dolphin was in West Street in Havant where it had been since the early part of the 19th Century; stagecoaches used it as the principal inn in Havant on the road between Brighton and Portsmouth. In 1958 it was demolished to make way for the West Street Arcade - itself demolished when the Meridian Centre (since renamed Meridian Shopping) was built – and was re-sited in Park Road South.  This has since been demolished to make way for a special needs home.

The bottom left of the shield contains the figures to be seen on the Hampshire badge, a crown over a rose. These figures are also used in the badge of the Hampshire RFU. This is a badge of great antiquity and was accepted in its present form by Hampshire County Council in 1895. In some forms of the badge there is a double rose – white in the centre and red on the outer edges – but the more ancient form, and the one shown on today’s badge is a Lancastrian red rose.

The bottom right contains a figure to represent a sheet of parchment representing the ancient craft of parchment making that was practised in Havant for hundreds of years and which finally ceased in 1936. There were a couple of firms still making parchment in Havant at the turn of the 20th century, Stallards working in Homewell and Stents in West Street. Stallards finally closed in 1936 and the buildings were occupied by the building firm, Carrells. Stents became glove makers before closing down in the 1950s, their premises being taken over by the building firm, Henry Jones.

References

External links
 

Bedhampton
Havant
English rugby union teams
Rugby clubs established in 1951
Rugby union clubs in Hampshire
1951 establishments in England